Post-nominal letters following a person's name in New Zealand mainly denote military and civilian awards and decorations, and also memberships of scholarly and professional associations.

Only orders and decorations unique to New Zealand are listed, although a number of 'British' honours are still part of the New Zealand Honours System, notably those that are in the personal gift of the Sovereign, i.e., the Order of the Garter, Order of the Thistle, Royal Victorian Order, and the Order of Merit. In addition, many living New Zealanders hold appointments in the orders that the New Zealand Order of Merit replaced.

List of post-nominal letters

See also 

 List of post-nominal letters (Australia)

References

External links
 Full list of honours

Post
Post
New Zealand